Not Even Happiness is the second studio album by American singer-songwriter Julie Byrne. It was released on 13 January 2017 by Basin Rock in the United Kingdom and on 27 January 2017 by Ba Da Bing Records in the United States.

Background and composition
The album was recorded and mixed in Byrne's hometown, Buffalo, New York, except for the string arrangements by Jake Falby, which were recorded at a cabin in Holderness, New Hampshire.

The album is labeled as a contemporary folk release. According to Ed Nash of The Line of Best Fit, Not Even Happiness features leitmotifs of "nature and matters of the heart".

Critical reception

Not Even Happiness received universal acclaim from music critics. On Metacritic, the album holds an average critic score of 82, based on 22 critics, indicating "universal acclaim". Ed Nash of The Line of Best Fit gave the album a positive review, dubbing it "Album of the Week".

Accolades

Track listing

Personnel
Credits adapted from Not Even Happiness album liner notes.

 Julie Byrne – writing, performing
 Michele Finkelstein – flute (track 3)
 Chris Masullo – guitar (track 8)
 Jake Falby – string arrangements
 Johanna Warren – backing vocals
 Eric Littmann – recording, mixing, synths and production
 Alan Douches – mastering
 Jonathan Bouknight – photography

References

2017 albums
Julie Byrne albums
Ba Da Bing Records albums
Contemporary folk albums